Wat Tuek is an intersection in the area of Samphanthawong and Chakkrawat Subdistricts, Bangkok's Samphanthawong District, where Yaowarat meets Chakkrawat Roads, considered to be the tip phase of Yaowarat Road, or better known as Bangkok's Chinatown. Yaowarat is a road with a length of about 1.5 km (0.93 mi) and is a road with traffic management as one-way. Starting from the Odeon Circle when passing this intersection and spans Khlong Rop Krung with Bhanubandhu Bridge, it will end at Merry Kings Intersection in front of the Wang Burapha in the area of Phra Nakhon District's Wang Burapha Phirom Subdistrict.  S.A.B. Intersection is paralleled on the Chakkrawat side, including close to Woeng Nakhon Khasem.

Its name "Wat Tuek" meaning "Building Temple", refers to Wat Chaichana Songkhram a nearby temple in the area of Khlong Thom. Wat Chaichana Songkhram is a temple built by Chao Phraya  Bodindecha, a nobleman in the reign of King Nangklao (Rama III) after he was a general and won the war. Because this temple is strange from other temples at the same time, it was built with concrete and full of buildings and structures. People therefore called "Wat Tuek" and became an informal name to date.

Chakkrawat Road is a short road with a length of only 1 km (0.62 mi) and has one-way traffic management, starting from S.A.B. Intersection and ran to the southwest through Wat Tuek Intersection before ending at the foot of Phra Pok Klao Bridge nearby.

Besides, in front of the building of Sang Thong Machinery Limited Partnership in this area still showing the last tram stop in Bangkok and Thailand, but it is a shame that it was demolished on March 4, 2019, along with the restoration of the wasteland of the Woeng Nakhon Khasem, also known as Thieves' Market.

References

Samphanthawong district
Road junctions in Bangkok